The Dayglo Abortions (sometimes abbreviated to DGA) are a Canadian hardcore punk and metal band from Victoria, British Columbia. Their lyrics reflect a genre-typical disregard for societal norms. The band was formed in 1979 and released their first album in 1981. The band has sold 500,000+ copies worldwide since their first release. The band's biography, Argh Fuck Kill: The Story of the Dayglo Abortions, by the author Chris Walter, was published in 2010 by Gofuckyerself Press. Gymbo Jak, the lead singer from 1994 to 2007, also sang for the Toronto-based Maximum RNR.

History

Legal trouble
The band is known for its graphic album covers. In 1988, a police officer in Nepean, Ontario, instigated a criminal investigation of the Dayglos after his daughter brought home a copy of Here Today, Guano Tomorrow. Obscenity charges were laid against the Dayglo Abortion's record label, Fringe Product, (carried by Alternative Tentacles in the US and embroiling Dead Kennedys frontman Jello Biafra in the battle for freedom of speech) and the label's record store, Record Peddler, but those charges were cleared in 1990.

Politics 
On their 2004 album, the Dayglos showed a new-found political awareness. Holy Shiite has song titles such as "America Eats Her Young", "Christina Bin Laden", "Scientology", and "Where's Bin Laden?".

Members

Current
Murray Acton "The Cretin", lead guitar and vocals, 1979–1994, 1998–present
Mike Jak, guitar, 1986-1994, 1997, 2009-present
"Blind" Marc, drums, 2011–present
Matt Fiorito, guitar, 2015–present

Former
"Jesus Bonehead", drums, 1979-2010
" Trevor"Spud"Hagen AKA "Stupid' "Couch Potato", Bass, 1979-1999
"Gymbo Jak", vocals, 1994-2007
"Hung Jak", guitar, 1995-2000
"Willy Jak", bass guitar, 2000-2018
"Nev The Impailer", guitar, 1986-1989
"Squid", lead guitar, 1994-1996
"Wayne Gretsky", guitar, 1985-1986

Timeline

Discography

Studio albums
Out of the Womb (1981)
Feed Us a Fetus (1986)
Here Today, Guano Tomorrow (1988)
Two Dogs Fucking (1991)
Little Man in the Canoe (1995)
Corporate Whores (1996)
Death Race 2000 (1999)
Holy Shiite (2004)
Armageddon Survival Guide (2016)
Hate Speech (2022)

Compilations
Stupid World, Stupid Songs (1998)
Live A.D. (2011)
Wake Up It's Time To Die (2019)

See also
List of bands from Canada

References

External links
 Dayglo Abortions official website
 Dayglo Abortions on Facebook
 Dayglo Abortions on Twitter

Canadian hardcore punk groups
Musical groups established in 1979
Musical groups from Victoria, British Columbia
Obscenity controversies in music
1979 establishments in British Columbia